Solveig Rogstad (born 31 July 1982) is a retired Norwegian biathlete.

References

External links
Solveig Rogstads blog
Solveig Rogstad profile at biathlonworld.com

1982 births
Living people
Norwegian female biathletes
Biathletes at the 2010 Winter Olympics
Olympic biathletes of Norway
21st-century Norwegian women